Hong Eun-hee (born February 17, 1980) is a South Korean actress.

Filmography

Television series

Variety/radio show

Web shows

Music video

Theater

Awards and nominations

References

External links
  
 Hong Eun-hee  at Namoo Actors 
 
 
 

1980 births
Living people
People from Jeongeup
20th-century South Korean actresses
21st-century South Korean actresses
South Korean child actresses
South Korean television actresses
South Korean stage actresses
Seoul Institute of the Arts alumni